Attie may refer to:

Attie people (Attié)
Attie language

People
Alice Attie (born 1950), American visual artist
Dotty Attie (born 1938), American artist, wife of David Attie and mother of Eli Attie
Eli Attie, American politician, son of David and Dotty Attie
 (born 1989), French volleyball player
Shimon Attie (born 1957), American visual artist
, French actress
Attie Howard (1871–1945), Canadian ice hockey player
Attie Maposa (born 1990), South African cricketer
Attie van Heerden (1898–1965), South African rugby player and Olympic athlete